Short Skirts is a 1921 American silent drama film directed by Harry B. Harris and starring Gladys Walton, Ena Gregory and Jack Mower.

Cast
 Gladys Walton as Natalie Smith
 Ena Gregory as Stella
 Jack Mower as 	Lance Christie
 Jean Hathaway as Mrs. Shirley Smith
 Scotty MacGregor as 	Spike Masters
 Edward Martindel as Wallace Brewster
 Harold Miller as Billy Gregg
 William Welsh as Woodward Christie
 Howard Ralston as Douglas Smith

References

Bibliography
 Goble, Alan. The Complete Index to Literary Sources in Film. Walter de Gruyter, 1999.

External links
 

1921 films
1921 drama films
1920s English-language films
American silent feature films
Silent American drama films
Films directed by Harry B. Harris
American black-and-white films
Universal Pictures films
1920s American films
English-language drama films